Polisportiva Dinamo, commonly known as Dinamo Sassari and currently known as Dinamo Banco di Sardegna Sassari for sponsorship reasons, is an Italian professional basketball club that is based in Sassari, Sardinia. They are the current European Cup Champions. The club plays in the Italian LBA, the highest level club competition in Italian professional basketball.

Dinamo was founded in 1960, and in the past, due to sponsorship deals, has also been known as Banco Popolare Sassari (1989–90). The club plays in the Serie A (the highest level for the men's basketball competitions in Italy), since 2010.

Dinamo Sassari is notable for being the club in Italian professional basketball to have made the impressive score of 158 points scored in a single game (with no overtimes), during the 1994–95 Serie A2 regular season, versus Pallacanestro Pavia (91); which is the highest score ever made by any club in Italy.

History
In 1994–95, the Dinamo team scored 158 points in a regular season game without overtimes against Pavia.

In 2010, Dinamo promoted to the Serie A, when it beat Prima Veroli in the Finals of the Playoffs.

In 2012, the club made its debut in Europe, when it played in the EuroCup regular season. The 2013–14 season was one of the most historic ever for the club. Banco di Sardegna Sassari won the Italian Cup, the team's first trophy. Dinamo's star player Travis Diener was named Italian Cup MVP. Later in the season Drake Diener – Travis' cousin – was named Italian League MVP. Dinamo also played in the EuroCup once again, and reached the eight-finals this time around.

Despite the third place and elimination in the Italian League semifinals in 2014, Dinamo was invited to play in the 2014–15 EuroLeague season. After Montepaschi Siena, runner-up in the Italian league, resigned the club received a B license.

In the 2014–15 season, Dinamo won its first Italian League championship. In Game 7 of the Italian League Finals, Sassari won 73–75, on the road against Reggio Emilia. Because of this, Dinamo returned to the EuroLeague in 2015. It was eliminated in the regular season and after transferring to the EuroCup it was eliminated in the round of 32.

In 2017, Dinamo reached the final of the Italian Cup, where it lost to Olimpia Milano. This season the club also made its debut in the Basketball Champions League and made the quarter-finals in its inaugural season. In the LBA, the team finished in the fifth place.

In the 2018–19 season, Dinamo played in the second qualifying round of FIBA Europe Cup. Here, it beat Benfica from Portugal to advance to the regular season. After advancing past the second round as well, Dinamo beat ZZ Leiden, Pınar Karşıyaka and Hapoel Holon. Thus, it qualified for the 2019 FIBA Europe Cup Finals where Dinamo faced German side s.Oliver Würzburg. On 1 May 2019, Sassari won the FIBA Europe Cup after defeating Würzburg in the second leg of the finals. It was the team's first European title.

In 2019 Sassari reached the LBA Finals for the second time in club history, four years since its championship. Dinamo was defeated by Umana Reyer Venezia in Game 7, losing the series 3–4.

Honours
Total titles: 6

Domestic competitions
 Italian League
 Winners (1): 2014–15
 Runners-up (1): 2018–19
 Italian Cup
 Winners (2): 2014, 2015 
 Runners-up (1): 2017
 Italian Supercup
 Winners (2): 2014, 2019

European competitions
 FIBA Europe Cup
 Winners (1): 2018–19

Other competitions
 Varallo Sesia, Italy Invitational Game
 Winners (1): 2011
 Torneo Città di Cagliari
 Runners-up (1): 2011
 Torneo Geovillage
 Winners (2): 2014, 2015
 Nuoro, Italy Invitational Game
 Winners (2): 2014, 2015
 Runners-up (1): 2018
 Sassari, Italy Invitational Game
 Winners (1): 2014
 Wroclaw, Poland Invitational Game
 Runners-up (1): 2014
 Torneo de Città di Sassari
 Runners-up (1): 2015
 Trofeo Meridiana
 Winners (1): 2015
 Olbia, Italy Invitational Game
 Winners (1): 2016
 Cagliari, Italy Invitational Game
 Winners (1): 2018
 Saturnia, Italy Invitational Game
 Winners (1): 2019

Season by season

Players

Retired numbers

Current roster

Depth chart

See also
 S.E.F. Torres 1903 
 Torres Calcio Femminile
 U.S.D. Latte Dolce

References

External links
 Official site 
 Eurobasket.com Team Page

Sassari
Sassari
Sport in Sardinia
EuroLeague clubs